Lloyd Bradley (born 21 January 1955) is a British music journalist and author.

Biography
Born in London to recent immigrants from St Kitts, Bradley discovered Jamaican music during his teenage years, while going out in the North London-based sound systems and created his own, named "Dark Star System", in the late 1970s.

He worked on several magazines in their early years, including Q and Empire for Emap Metro, and launched Big! for the same company. Together with Mat Snow, he developed Maxim for Dennis Publishing, and worked on the launch of Encore magazine in 1994 for Haymarket. He then joined GQ as an editor, moving in 2003 to US company Rodale as an editorial consultant on Men's Health and Runner's World magazines.

Bradley is currently a freelance journalist and consultant for many titles. He is also working on a biography of George Clinton, that sets P-Funk in its correct socio-political context.
His journalistic contributions have been published in NME, Black Music magazine, The Guardian and Mojo, among other publications.

Bradley's Bass Culture (2001) is a book on reggae music. He was associate producer of the BBC2 series Reggae: The Story of Jamaican Music. His 2013 book, Sounds Like London: 100 Years of Black Music in the Capital, received positive review coverage, described in The Independent as an "exceptional work [that] can sit proudly beside the author's earlier Bass Culture: When Reggae Was King, the definitive account of the glory days of the Jamaican music industry."

Bradley is also a classically trained chef who divides his time between London and Florida.

Bibliography 
 Rock Year Book Vol. 9, Virgin Books, 1988. 
 Rock Yearbook, St Martin's Press, UK, 1989. 
 With Gary Glitter, Leader: The Autobiography of Gary Glitter, London: Ebury Press, 1991, 
 Soul on CD: The Essential Guide, 1994, Kyle Cathie Ltd, UK, 
 Reggae on CD: The Essential Guide, first edition, Trafalgar Square Publishing, UK, 1996, 
 Rod Stewart: Every Picture Tells a Story, London Bridge, UK, 1999. 
 Reggae: The Story of Jamaican Music, photographs by Dennis Morris, BBC Books, UK, 2001. 
 Bass Culture: When Reggae Was King, Penguin Books Ltd, UK, 2001. . Different editions:
 USA: This Is Reggae Music: The Story of Jamaica's Music, Grove Press, USA, 2001. 
 France: Bass Culture: Quand le Reggae était roi, translation Manuel Rabasse, 2005, Editions Allia, France. 
 Germany: Bass Culture Der Siegeszug des Reggae, Hanibal. 
 Japan: Bass Culture, Shinko. 
 Italy: Bass Culture: La Musica dalla Giamaica: ska, rocksteady, roots reggae, dub & dancehall, Shake Edizioni. 
 Spain: Bass Culture: La historia del reggae, translation Tomás González Cobos. Acuarela & A. Machado, Spain. 
 The Rough Guide To Running, Rough Guide, 2007. 
 The Rough Guide to Men's Health, Rough Guide, 2009. 
 Sounds Like London: 100 Years of Black Music in the Capital, London: Serpent's Tail, 2013. 
 With Ian Wright, A Life in Football: My Autobiography, London: Constable, 2016, 
 With Marcia Barrett, Forward: My Life With and Without Boney M., Constable, 2018,

References

External links
 Official website
 LLoyd Bradley Profile at The Guardian.
 Lloyd Bradley page at Rock's Back Pages.

1955 births
21st-century English male writers
Black British writers
British male journalists
English music critics
English people of Saint Kitts and Nevis descent
Living people
Reggae journalists
The Guardian journalists
Writers from London